The 77th Indian Infantry Brigade was an infantry brigade formation of the Indian Army during World War II. It was formed in India in June 1942. The brigade was assigned to the Chindits and organised into eight columns for operations behind enemy lines in Burma. In March 1945, it was converted into the 77th Indian Parachute Brigade and assigned to the 44th Airborne Division.

Composition

1942–1943
 13th Battalion, King's Regiment (Liverpool)
 3rd Battalion, 2nd Gurkha Rifles
 2nd Battalion, Burma Rifles
 3rd Battalion, 9th Gurkha Rifles January 1944–August 1944
 12th Battalion, Nigeria Regiment April 1944–May 1944
 7th Battalion, Nigeria Regiment April 1944–May 1944

1943–1945
 3rd Battalion, 6th Gurkha Rifles
 1st Battalion, King's Regiment (Liverpool)
 1st Battalion, Lancashire Fusiliers
 1st Battalion, South Staffordshire Regiment

77th Parachute Brigade
 15th (King's) Parachute Battalion
 16th (Staffords) Parachute Battalion
 2nd Battalion, Indian Parachute Regiment
 4th Battalion, Indian Parachute Regiment

See also

 List of Indian Army Brigades in World War II

References

British Indian Army brigades
Military units and formations in Burma in World War II